"Hey, Good Lookin'" is a 1951 song written and recorded by Hank Williams, and his version was inducted into the Grammy Hall of Fame in 2001. In 2003, CMT voted the Hank Williams version No. 19 on CMT's 100 Greatest Songs of Country Music. Since its original 1951 recording it has been covered by a variety of artists.

Background
The Hank Williams song "borrowed heavily" from the 1942 song with the same title written by Cole Porter for the Broadway musical Something for the Boys. The lyrics for the Williams version begin as a come on using double entendres related to food preparation ("How's about cookin' somethin' up with me?"). By the third and fourth verses, the singer is promising the object of his affection that they can become an exclusive couple ("How's about keepin' steady company?" and "I'm gonna throw my date book over the fence").

Williams was friendly with musician Jimmy Dickens. Having told Dickens that Dickens needed a hit record if he was going to become a star, Williams said he would write it, and penned "Hey Good Lookin'" in only 20 minutes while on a plane with Dickens, Minnie Pearl, and Pearl's husband Henry Cannon. A week later Williams recorded it himself, jokingly telling Dickens, "That song's too good for you!"

"Hey, Good Lookin'" was recorded on March 16, 1951, at Castle Studio in Nashville. The same session also produced the single's B-side "My Heart Would Know" as well as another pair of tunes that would be released as singles: "I Can't Help It (If I'm Still in Love with You)" and "Howlin' at the Moon", released on April 27, 1951. The "Hey, Good Lookin'" single would follow on June 22. Williams was backed on the session by members of his Drifting Cowboys band, including Jerry Rivers (fiddle), Don Helms (steel guitar), Sammy Pruett (electric guitar), Jack Shook (rhythm guitar), Ernie Newton or "Cedric Rainwater", aka Howard Watts (bass), and either Owen Bradley or producer Fred Rose on piano. As author Colin Escott observes, "On one level, it seemed to point toward rock 'n' roll (hot rods, dancing sprees, goin' steady, and soda pop), but the rhythm plodded along with a steppity-step piano, and Hank sounded almost dour."

Williams performed the song on the Kate Smith Evening Hour on March 26, 1952; the appearance remains one of the few existing film clips of the singer performing live. He is introduced by Roy Acuff and banters with a young June Carter. He is wearing his famous white cowboy suit adorned in musical notes. He performed "Hey, Good Lookin'" and joined in with the rest of the cast singing his own "I Saw The Light". The rare clip displays the singer's exuberance on stage while performing an up-tempo number, and he appears at ease in the relatively new broadcast medium of television. The kinescope from this show would provide the footage for the Hank Williams Jr. video "There's a Tear in My Beer" some 37 years later.

Notable cover versions
In 1951, Jo Stafford and Frankie Laine released a cover of the song as a duet, peaking at No. 21 on the Billboard Hot 100 charts.
Country music band the Mavericks released a cover version in 1992 from the album From Hell to Paradise. This rendition peaked at number 74 on the country singles charts.
In 2004, Jimmy Buffett covered the song for his License to Chill album. Clint Black, Kenny Chesney, Alan Jackson, Toby Keith and George Strait were all featured on this rendition, which peaked at No. 8 on the Billboard Hot Country Singles & Tracks (now Hot Country Songs) charts in 2004. It was also the last Top Ten country hit for Black. This rendition was made into a music video, directed by Trey Fanjoy and Stan Kellam.

Chart performance

Hank Williams

The Mavericks

Jimmy Buffett

Year-end charts

References

Sources
 

1942 songs
1951 singles
1992 singles
2004 singles
Hank Williams songs
Jo Stafford songs
Frankie Laine songs
Ray Charles songs
Connie Stevens songs
The Mavericks songs
Jimmy Buffett songs
Clint Black songs
Kenny Chesney songs
Alan Jackson songs
Toby Keith songs
George Strait songs
Vocal collaborations
Songs written by Hank Williams
Music videos directed by Trey Fanjoy
Grammy Hall of Fame Award recipients
Music videos directed by John Lloyd Miller
MGM Records singles
MCA Records singles
RCA Records Nashville singles